The 4th Maintenance Battalion was a battalion of the United States Marine Corps Reserve that provided intermediate-level maintenance for the Marine Reserve's tactical ordnance, engineer, motor transport, communications electronics and general support ground equipment. They were headquartered in New Orleans, Louisiana with subordinate units throughout the United States. They fell under the command of 4th Marine Logistics Group. As part of the 2010 Force Structure Review Group, 4th Maintenance Battalion was reorganized into Combat Logistics Battalion 451 and Combat Logistics Battalion 453.

Mission
Provide general support and intermediate (3rd and 4th echelon) maintenance support for Marine Corps furnished tactical ordnance, engineer, motor transport, communications electronics, and general support ground equipment. The Battalion is structured to provide command and control for centralized coordination and decentralized execution of maintenance efforts to sustain combat power. Subordinate Elements are organized along functional area lines to provide maintenance support in commodity areas that are critical to Marine Forces Reserve's war fighting capability.

Subordinate units
 Headquarters And Service Company (HSC) Charlotte, North Carolina
 Electronic Equipment Maintenance Company (EEMC) – Wichita, Kansas
 Detachment 1, Electronic Equipment Maintenance Company (1-EEMC) – Greensboro, North Carolina
 Detachment 2, Electronic Equipment Maintenance Company (2-EEMC) – Indianapolis, Indiana
 Engineer Equipment Maintenance Company (EEMC) – Omaha, Nebraska
 General Support Maintenance Company (GSMC) – Rock Island, Illinois
 Motor Transport Maintenance Company (MTMC) – 4th Maintenance Battalion – Sacramento, California
 Detachment 1, Motor Transport Maintenance Company (1-MTMC) – Abilene, Texas
 Detachment 2, Motor Transport Maintenance Company (2-MTMC) – Augusta, Georgia
 Detachment 3, Motor Transport Maintenance Company (3-MTMC) – Allentown, Pennsylvania
 Ordnance Maintenance Company (OMC) – Waco, Texas
 Ordnance Contact Team 1 (OCT 1) – Fort Devens

History

See also

History of the United States Marine Corps
List of United States Marine Corps battalions

References

 4th Maintenance Battalion's official website

4th Marine Logistics Group
Maint4